Double penetration (sometimes called DP for short) is a sexual practice that consists of a person being simultaneously penetrated either in multiple orifices or in a single orifice by multiple body parts or other objects. Most commonly, it refers to two penises penetrating a woman both vaginally and anally at the same time.

Practice
The act usually involves the insertion and thrusting of two erect penises into a woman's vagina and anus simultaneously. It is a common practice in pornography. The term can also describe the insertion and thrusting of two erect penises into either the single orifice of a woman (either the vagina or anus) or the anus of a man.

Penetration can be carried out not only with a penis, but also with different parts of the body (hands, fingers) or with specific sex toys. The simultaneous penetration of a vagina by two penises is known as double vaginal penetration (DVP). Simultaneous penetration of the anus is known as double anal penetration (DAP).

The sexual act may be pleasurable for the woman due to the simultaneous stimulation of the G-spot and the anterior fornix. The men may derive pleasure from the tightness of the vagina and/or anus, as well as from their penises rubbing together either in the same orifice or through the lining of the rectovaginal fascia.

History

Representations of double penetration have been depicted in many Roman erotic objects, as well as in the Kama Sutra. The first filmed double penetration in history appeared in 1970, in the movie "Delphia the Greek", by director Lasse Braun.

The feminist Bernadette Barton has argued that double penetration, because it usually involves two men's penises close together or directly touching, is an "unusually homoerotic" act in an otherwise homophobic culture. Barton also thinks double penetration is "bizarre" and "body punishing" because it can stretch a woman's orifices to their physical limit. Gail Dines believes double penetration is an extreme act that was "almost non-existent" before the 2010s, but that has now become one of the most popular types of pornography, a shift she attributes to misogyny.

The pornographic actor James Deen denies that double penetration is inherently "homosexual activity", even if two penises are in the same orifice, believing that the motivation of the male performer determines whether the act is homosexual or not.

Spit-roast (sexual act) 
The spit-roast sexual act is a variation of double penetration whereby a person is penetrated in the rear by one penis (either in the vagina or anus) and performs oral sex on another penis. This sexual act combines both the doggy style position with a fellatio; the "spit-roast" is frequently depicted within pornography.

See also
Threesome
Group sex
Anal sex
Bisexual pornography

References 

Group sex
Sex positions
Sexual acts
Pornography terminology